Kiumars Pourahmad (born 16 December 1949 in Najaf Abad, Isfahan, Iran) is an Iranian film director, screenwriter, film editor and film producer.

Career
Pourahmad started his career as a film critic and assistant director in a TV series in early 1970s. He made his directorial debut, Tatureh in 1983 after making some short films. Children and young adults with their problems are the central characters in most of his films. Recently, Pourahmad has shown a tendency toward mass audience and box office and his latest film, The Yalda Night, was a self-expression. Pourahmad recently published his autobiography, Unfinished Childhood.

Filmography

Cinema

 Tatoureh, 1984
 Bibi Chelchele, 1984
 Goyar, 1987
 The Harbour, 1988
 Silent Hunt, 1989
 The Shame 1992
 The Morning After, 1992
 Bread and Poem, 1993
 For the Sake of Haniyeh 1994
 Khaharan-e-gharib, 1995
 Yalda Night, 2001
 Gol-e Yakh, 2005
 Noke Borj, 2005
 The Night Bus, 2007
 Where Are My Shoes?, 2016
 Blade and Termeh 2019
 The Night Guardian 2022

TV
 The Tales of Majid, 1990
 Sarenakh, 1997
 Parantez Baz, 2010

References

External links

 Photograph of Kiumars Pourahmad, Āftāb, Friday 9 February 2007

Iranian film directors
Iranian screenwriters
Iranian film editors
People from Najafabad
1949 births
Living people
Crystal Simorgh for Best Director winners